Hovhannavank is a medieval monastery located in the village of Ohanavan in the Aragatsotn Province of Armenia. The monastery stands on the edge of the Kasagh River canyon, and its territory is adjacent to the village of Ohanavan. The deep gorge is carved by the Kasagh River.

History and architecture 
The oldest part of the monastery is the single nave basilica of St. Karapet (i.e. Holy Forerunner, John the Baptist) that was founded at the beginning of the fourth century by St. Gregory the Enlightener, who baptized Armenia into the world's first Christian nation. The wooden roof of the early church was replaced in 554 AD with a thatch cover, and the basilica itself underwent profound renovation between 1652 and 1734.

The centerpiece of the monastery is the Cathedral built between 1216 and 1221 through the donation of Prince Vache I Vachutian Amberdtsi (Վաչե Ա). The Cathedral has a cruciform floor plan, with two storey sacristies in each of the four extensions of the church. The dome has an umbrella-shaped roof, which is unique to Armenian churches. The Cathedral's important decorations include carved scenes from the Parable of the Wise and Foolish Virgins (Matthew 25:1-13).

In 1250, Vache I's son, Kurt I Vachutian, built a narthex (gavit) next to the western wall of the Cathedral. The narthex is supported by four base pillars and features a central rotunda (added in 1274) that rests on twelve columns. Between the 12th and 17th centuries, Hovhannavank was known as an important educational and theological center of Eastern Armenia that had a scriptorium where manuscripts were written and illuminated. The monastery was described in details in 1686 by the historian Zakaria Kanakertsi who spent his entire life at Hovhannavank.

The monastery walls are covered with rich lapidary inscriptions. One large engraved text high on the northern wall of one of the monastery's auxiliary structures reads:

"...By the grace of merciful God, during the reign of Queen Tamar, daughter of the great Gevorg, in the year 642 (1200 AD) of the race of Torgom, we—brothers Zakaria and Ivane — sons of Sargis the Great, son of Avag Zakarian, when the light of God’s grace rose and entered Armenia and raised us from weakness in the battle against the enemies of Christ and destroyed their power and quenched their violence, with the country of Ararat delivered from the heavy yoke of their servitude, wished to make offering and gave the tribute of the grace to the Holy Forerunner of Hovhannavank ..."

Another key inscription was left by Konstandin I, Katholicos of Armenia.

Hovhannavank's Cathedral belongs to the category of “Gandzasar-style” ecclesiastical edifices that were built approximately at the same time in different parts of Armenia, and were endowed with similar compositional and decorative characteristics (another example—Cathedral of the Haritchavank Monastery).
Those include umbrella-shaped dome, cruciform floor plan, narthex (often with stalactite-ornamented ceiling), and high-relief of a large cross on one of church's walls.  In 1918, the dome and the southern wall were destroyed by a powerful earthquake; both were reconstructed in the 1990s.

Gallery

References

Bibliography 
 Zakaria Kanakertsi (1627-1699). Chronicle. Moscow, 1969
 Armenia: 1700 years of Christian Architecture. Moughni Publishers, Yerevan, 2001
 Tom Masters and Richard Plunkett. Georgia, Armenia & Azerbaijan, Lonely Planet Publications; 2 edition (July 2004)
 Nicholas Holding. Armenia with Nagorno Karabagh, Bradt Travel Guides; Second edition (October, 2006)

See also 

Gandzasar, an architecturally similar monastery in Artsakh
Saghmosavank, a nearby monastery

Christian monasteries in Armenia
Tourist attractions in Aragatsotn Province
Medieval Armenia
Christian monasteries established in the 13th century
Oriental Orthodox congregations established in the 13th century
Buildings and structures in Aragatsotn Province